HHHS may refer to:

 Lebanon
 Houssam Hariri High School,  in Sharhabil, Saida

 Australia
 Hunters Hill High School, in  Sydney, New South Wales

 South Africa
 Hottentots Holland High School, in Western Cape

 United States
 Hasbrouck Heights High School in New Jersey
 Haddon Heights High School, in New Jersey
 Hamilton Heights High School, in Arcadia, Indiana
 Hatboro-Horsham Senior High School, in Horsham, Pennsylvania 
 Hendrick Hudson High School in Montrose, New York
 Heritage Hills High School, in Lincoln City, Indiana
 Herbert Hoover High School (disambiguation)
 Houston Heights High School, in Houston, Texas
 Hunter Huss High School, in Gastonia, North Carolina